During the 1975–76 season, Juventus competed in Serie A, the Coppa Italia, and the European Cup.

Summary
During the summer, president Giampiero Boniperti transferred in midfielder Marco Tardelli from Como Calcio (in an exchange loan of youngster Paolo Rossi to that club) and striker Sergio Gori from Cagliari Calcio (in an exchange in which defender Silvio Longobucco transferred out to the island).
 
Carlo Parola, in his second season as manager, led the team to a second-place league finish behind champion Torino F.C. (for whom this was the first league title in 27 years since the Superga air disaster). During this season, Juventus lost both matches against its local rivals, and disagreements between Parola and several players occurred, especially veterans Fabio Capello and Pietro Anastasi and the group of players headed by Giuseppe Furino and Roberto Bettega. At the end of the season, Boniperti sacked Parola and appointed Giovanni Trapattoni for the next season as head coach.

The team was eliminated from the Coppa Italia in the group phase by Internazionale after a 1–0 defeat in San Siro. In the European Cup, the team won the first-round tie against CSKA Sofia, but was defeated in the round of 16 by German side Borussia Mönchengladbach (with an aggregate score of 1–2).

Squad

Transfers

Competitions

Serie A

League table

Results by round

Matches

Coppa Italia

Group 1

Matches

European Cup

First round

Second round

Statistics

Players statistics

References

Juventus
Juventus F.C. seasons